Springfield High School was the first public high school in Springfield, Oregon, United States. It is one of four high schools in the Springfield School District.

Academics
In 2008, 78% of the school's seniors received their high school diploma. Of 310 students, 243 graduated, 37 dropped out, 12 received a modified diploma, and 18 are still in high school.

Notable alumni
Ken Kesey - Beat Generation author, One Flew Over the Cuckoo's Nest
Eric Millegan - actor, Bones
Maria Mutola - Olympic Runner and gold medalist, multiple 800m World Champion
Greg McMackin - is a retired American football coach and former player.
Melody Carlson - award-winning novelist of more than 250 books
Mercedes Russell - Center on Seattle Storm
Jasmin Savoy Brown-Actor; Yellowjackets, scream 5

References

High schools in Lane County, Oregon
Springfield, Oregon
Public high schools in Oregon